Bratan or Catur or Tjatur contains three caldera lakes at the north of Bali island. The volcanic complex covers 11 × 6 km wide area. The largest post-caldera cone within the complex is Gunung Batukaru.

See also 

 List of volcanoes in Indonesia

References

External links 

Calderas of Indonesia
Volcanoes of Bali